Julia burni is a species of a sea snail with shell of two separate hinged pieces or valves, a marine gastropod mollusk in the family Juliidae.

Distribution
The type locality for this species is Port Blair in Andaman Islands, India.

References

External links 

Juliidae
Gastropods described in 1975